Cooking with Master Chefs was a PBS television cooking show that featured Julia Child visiting 16 celebrated chefs in the United States. An episode that featured Lidia Bastianich was nominated for a 1994 Emmy Award. Other chefs she visited included Emeril Lagasse, Jacques Pépin, and Alice Waters. The show featured a companion book of the same name, published in 1993. Reruns of the show currently air on WUCF-TV.

Episodes

External links
Julia Child: Cooking with Master Chefs at PBS.org

1990s American cooking television series
PBS original programming